Generalissimo Francisco de Miranda Air Base , commonly called by its former name of La Carlota, is located in Caracas, Venezuela. The airport is named for Francisco de Miranda, a South American revolutionary.

On 27 November 1992, the airport was bombed during Hugo Chávez's attempted coup.  It has been closed to public use since 2005 and is used only for military purposes and aeromedic flights (EMS).

In April 2019, the airport was the starting point of the 2019 Venezuela uprising.

Controversy

Opponents of President Hugo Chávez claimed that private use of the airfield is allowed for people who get individual permission from the government. Direct observation of the airfield shows several landings per day by the kinds of small jets used for general aviation. No planespotter information is available for this airport, so it is difficult to determine whether these jets are military, government or private.

Events La Carlota
La Carlota has occasionally been used as an event center, having a capacity of 200 people. Some concerts that have occurred include:

External links

Airports in Venezuela
Buildings and structures in Caracas
Transport in Caracas